Cabildo Insular de Tenerife (Island Council of Tenerife) is the governing body of the island of Tenerife (Canary Islands). It was established on 16 March 1913 in Santa Cruz de Tenerife, in a session held by the City Council. It was, at that time, the first corporation. The Cabildo of Tenerife, like the other councils of the Canary Islands, enjoys a number of local powers as contained in the Statute of Autonomy of the Canaries, other powers are delegated to the ministries of the territorial government.

Offices
The initial location of the Tenerife Town Hall was the Santa Cruz de Tenerife City council building. In its first year the government transferred the offices to a building located at the intersection of the 25 de Julio Avenue and Numancia Street in the capital, Tinerfeña. A later transfer took the Town Hall support offices to Alfonso XII Street (currently Castillo Street), where they remained until 1928. In that year, due to the need to find a larger location to accommodate the office, there was a move to a new building located directly opposite the former, several floors rented.

Although 100,000 pesetas was set aside to purchase a plot and blueprints were already developed in 1920, these plans did not materialize. After ten years the first steps were taken to acquire land in the area of the Marítima Avenue and provide the corporation with a settled home. Negotiations began with the Ministry of Development for authorization. Construction of the development project in that area of the city began in 1933 under the direction of engineer, José Luis Escario.

The building was completed in late 1940 and the offices of the Santa Cruz de Tenerife were quickly filled. The new building, the Palacio Insular de Tenerife houses some departments of the Cabildo, but there are also other decentralized offices in different locations, and key offices elsewhere in the metropolitan area. The building is notable for its great tower decorated with a clock, commissioned in 1950, which chimes hourly, and is one of the more recognized symbols in the city of Santa Cruz de Tenerife. Inside the building is an interesting collection of art, which includes murals that adorn the entire Salón Noble popularly called the "Sistine Chapel of the Canary Islands," with paintings done in 1960 by the painter José Aguiar. In November 2011 these paintings were declared of cultural interest to the Canaries.

Internal organization 
The Town Hall administration is made up of the following departments:
 Presidency
 Plenary Session
 Government Council
 Supervising Agencies
 Plenary Session Commissions
 Council of Spokesmen
 Political Groups

Departments
The Island Council is composed of the following departments:
 Presidency
 Tourism and Planning
 Health, Relations with the University of La Laguna
 Sustainability, Territory and Environment
 Administration and Treasury
 Economy and Competitiveness
 Social Welfare, Education, Equality and Sport
 Roads, Municipal Co-operation and Housing
 Human Resources and Legal Defence Area
 Agriculture, Livestock, Fishing and Water
 Mobility and Security
 Culture, Heritage and Museums

Responsibilities and Authority 
According to article 43 of the LRJAPC, the exclusive responsibilities of the town hall are:
The coordination of the municipal services of the island to guarantee its integral and suitable benefit to the entire insular territory, replacing the City Councils when the insufficiency of their resources prevents the provision of essential municipal services or established public functions in the LBRL.
The attendance to and legal, economic and technical cooperation with the municipalities, especially with those of smaller economic capacity and management.
The provision of supramunicipal public services.
The approval of plans by insular offices for the provision of works and services in collaboration with the City Councils of each island. To achieve such, the city councils will make the work proposals that affect their municipal area, which should not be modified by the respective Town Hall, except with reasonable causes and a prior hearing with the affected city council.
The promotion and administration of the peculiar interests of the island.

Law 14/1990, of 26 July, Legal Regime of the Public Administrations of the Canary Islands, transfers to the town halls the following competences:
 The territorial demarcations, alteration of terms and denomination of the municipalities, previous opinion of the Consultative Council of the Canary Islands.
 Own functions of the Agencies of Agrarian Extension.
 Experimental farms.
 Forest services, cattle routes and grass.
 Marine Aquacultures.
 Protection of the environment.
 Management and conservation of protected natural spaces, within the framework of established clause of autonomous sectoral legislation.
 Hunting
 Rural infrastructure of insular character.
 Subrogation of the municipal competences on city-planning, in conformity with the established clause of autonomous sectoral legislation.
 Highways, except those declared of regional interest, within the framework of the autonomous sectoral legislation. In the highways of regional interest, the operation, use and defence of sanctioning regimes.
 The management of ports of refuge, unless they are declared of regional interest.
 Hydraulic works that are not of regional or general interest. Hydraulic work – conservation and policing of insular terrestrial water administration in the terms established by autonomous sectoral legislation.
 Transports by highway and cable. Railroads, in the framework within which it has autonomous sectoral legislation.
 Fairs and markets.
 Policing of spectacles.
 Promotion and policing of the insular tourism, except for the powers of inspection and sanction.
 Annoying, unhealthy, injurious and dangerous activities.
 Policing of houses.
 Conservation and administration of public parks.
 Administration of the residences of students established in the island.
 The promotion of culture, sports, occupation, leisure and relaxation in the insular scope.
 The conservation and administration of the insular historical-artistic patrimony.
 Museums, libraries and archives that are not reserved by the Independent Community.
 Promotion of crafts.
 Social attendance and social services.
 Defense of the consumer.
 Campaigns on animal health.

Current president 
The current president is Carlos Enrique Alonso Rodríguez.

See also 
 ALiX Project

References

External links
  Insular Council of Tenerife

Tenerife
Cabildos of the Canary Islands
Government of the Canary Islands